Tham Luang may refer to:

Tham Luang Nang Non, a cave in the area of Doi Nang Non, Chiang Rai Province, Thailand
Tham Luang Chiang Dao, a cave in the area of Doi Chiang Dao, Chiang Mai Province, Thailand
Tham Luang Mae Sap, a cave in Khun Khan National Park, Chiang Mai Province, Thailand
Tham Luang Pha Wiang, a cave in Ban Hong District, Lamphun Province, Thailand

See also
Tham Luang cave rescue, 2018 event at Tham Luang Nang Non